The delicate blue-eye (Pseudomugil tenellus)  is a species of fish in the subfamily Pseudomugilinae. It is found in northern Australia and Papua New Guinea.

References

Fish of New Guinea
Pseudomugil
Taxa named by William Ralph Taylor
Fish described in 1964